DXGT (92.1 FM), broadcasting as Radyo Abante 92.1, is a radio station owned and operated by Iddes Broadcast Group. Its studios and transmitter are located beside the Maramag Integrated Bus Terminal, Brgy. North Poblacion, Maramag. The station is managed by former Bukidnon 3rd District board member Gordon Torres.

Incidents

The radio station was attacked with a grenade in June 2013 during a broadcast by one of its commentators, Joas Dignos. Dignos was shot and killed in November 2013 in Valencia. Local police investigating the case did not rule out the possibility that the Dignos was targeted for his political commentary. According to the Committee to Protect Journalists, the incident is part of a pattern of killings that have earned the Philippines a reputation as "one of the most dangerous places in the world to be a reporter".

References

Radio stations in Bukidnon
Radio stations established in 2003